Glenea plagifera is a species of beetle in the family Cerambycidae. It was described by Per Olof Christopher Aurivillius in 1913. It is known from Borneo and Malaysia. It contains the variety Glenea plagifera var. unimaculata.

References

plagifera
Beetles described in 1913